Dean Richard Collins (born May 30, 1990) is an American former actor, best known for playing the character Mike Gold in the Fox television sitcom The War at Home. The series ran from September 2005 to April 2007. Previously, he had recurring roles in MADtvs "Reading Caboose" skit as Ernie, and as Warren Feide in Jack & Bobby. Collins also appeared as Harry Beardsley in the 2005 film Yours, Mine & Ours, as Garrett in the 2006 film Hoot, and in the 2008 film The Least of These. In 2011, Collins was cast in the pilot episode of ABC's Lost and Found. Collins makes regular appearances as the unofficial part time, sometimes co-host on actor Michael Rapaport's podcast, I Am Rapaport.

Personal life
Collins was born in Los Angeles, California. He has a younger sister, and two older brothers, Blake Collins, a professional singer-songwriter, and Nick Collins, who works at a full scale talent agency in Beverly Hills. Collins is Jewish.

Collins became good friends with fellow actor Logan Lerman, while playing his character's best friend in Jack & Bobby, and they remained close after the series' cancellation. They worked together again on Hoot, where Collins had a supporting role.  In their spare time, the two collaborated on creating short comedic films, which they uploaded to YouTube under their joint account name of "monkeynuts1069".

Collins and Lerman also formed a band called Indigo, along with musician Daniel Pashman.  Collins sang lead vocals, Lerman played keyboard and guitar, and Pashman played drums.

Filmography

Film

Television

References

External links
 
 

1990 births
Male actors from Los Angeles
American male child actors
American male film actors
American male television actors
Living people
American Jews
Jewish actors